Robyn Francis is an Australian permaculture figure founder of Permaculture College Australia.

Having worked in Permaculture since 1983 permaculture throughout Australia and overseas, Robyn was founding director of Permaculture International Ltd (PIL) in 1987, designer and creator of Djanbung Gardens, Australia's leading permaculture centre.

Permaculture College Australia and Djanbung Gardens
In December 1992, Robyn began developing a permaculture training centre and demonstration farm on 5 acres of degraded cow pasture in sub-tropical Northern NSW. 19 years later, Djanbung Gardens has a wide range of working systems demonstrating approaches to sustainable living and design through guided and self-guide tours as well as training programs including short courses, part and full-time accredited training, and residential internships. Permaculture Education and Permaculture College Australia operate from Djanbung Gardens.

Projects
Developed Accredited Permaculture Training
Permaculture Trainer, Permaculture Education & Permaculture College Australia Inc
Design Consultant Nimbin Ecovillage
EcoRecreation Reserve, Nusajaya, Malaysia
Permaculture Design Consultant, Canyon Ranch Bali
Consultant, NSW Dept. Planning Sustainable Futures Planning & Design
Design Consultant, Jarlanbah Permaculture Hamlet, Nimbin
Cummeragunga Aboriginal Village, Community & Land Development

Writing
Design for the Human Life Cycle – Building, Eco-Villages, Energy Systems, Land, People Systems. 10 November 2008
Design with Energy in Mind – Building, Energy Systems, Waste Systems & Recycling, Waste Water. 18 November 2008
Bamboo in Permaculture – Pip Magazine, March 2015

See also
Permaculture College Australia
Djanbung Gardens
Permaculture

References

External links
Permaculture College Australia/Djanbung Gardens
Permaculure Australia

Australian women scientists
Living people
Permaculturalists
Year of birth missing (living people)